Milenge is a constituency of the National Assembly of Zambia. It covers Milenge District in Luapula Province. Until 2016 it was named Chembe.

List of MPs

References

Constituencies of the National Assembly of Zambia
1973 establishments in Zambia
Constituencies established in 1973